Methylphosphonyl difluoride (DF), also known as EA-1251  or difluoro, is a chemical weapon precursor. Its chemical formula is CH3POF2.  It is a Schedule 1 substance under the Chemical Weapons Convention. It is used for production of sarin and soman as a component of binary chemical weapons; an example is the M687 artillery shell, where it is used together with a mixture of isopropyl alcohol and isopropyl amine, producing sarin.

Preparation 
Methylphosphonyl difluoride can be prepared by reacting methylphosphonyl dichloride with hydrogen fluoride (HF) or sodium fluoride (NaF).

Safety
Methylphosphonyl difluoride is both reactive and corrosive. It is absorbed through skin and causes burns and mild nerve agent symptoms. It reacts with water, producing HF fumes and methylphosphonic acid as a result. It is also capable of corroding glass.

Significance in international relations
In 2013–2014, the stockpile of chemicals covered by the CWC was removed from Syria and destroyed.  Of the stockpile, 581 tons (over 96%) of the stockpile was DF.  It was destroyed by the U.S. Army on the MV Cape Ray by hydrolysis.

References

Fluorides
Organophosphine oxides
Nerve agent precursors